John Gush (2 July 1935 – 8 March 2014) was a South African cricketer. He played in four first-class matches for Eastern Province in 1956/57 and 1957/58.

See also
 List of Eastern Province representative cricketers

References

External links
 

1935 births
2014 deaths
South African cricketers
Eastern Province cricketers
People from Makhanda, Eastern Cape
Cricketers from the Eastern Cape